Jenin (also spelled Jinin) is a Syrian village in the Tartous Governorate. According to the Syria Central Bureau of Statistics (CBS), Jenin had a population of 896 in the 2004 census.

References

Populated places in Safita District